Kaoani comes from the Japanese  and .  Kaoanis are small animated smilies that usually bounce up and down to look like they are floating. Kaoani originate in Japan and are also known as puffs, anime blobs, anikaos or anime emoticons.

Kaoani can take the form of animals, foodstuffs such as rice balls, colorful blobs, cartoon characters, etc. Many are animated to be performing a certain task, such as dancing, laughing, or cheering.

The file format for kaoanis is usually GIF, since it supports animations. However, it is also possible to make them in the APNG format, which is an animated PNG image. Kaoanis are mostly used on internet forums, MySpace profiles, blogs and instant messaging software to show moods or as avatars.

See also 
Kaomoji
Emoticon
Smiley

Anime and manga terminology
Internet culture